is a railway station on the Iida Line in the town of Iijima, Kamiina District, Nagano Prefecture, Japan, operated by Central Japan Railway Company (JR Central).

Lines
Tagiri Station is served by the Iida Line and is 160.1 kilometers from the starting point of the line at Toyohashi Station.

Station layout
The station consists of one ground-level side platform serving one bi-directional track. There is no station building, but only a shelter built on the platform. The station is unattended.

Adjacent stations

History
Tagiri Station opened on 11 February 1918. The station was relocated June 1984 approximately 150 meters south of its original location, which was on a curve. With the privatization of Japanese National Railways (JNR) on 1 April 1987, the station came under the control of JR Central.

Passenger statistics
In fiscal 2016, the station was used by an average of 38 passengers daily (boarding passengers only).

Surrounding area

See also
 List of railway stations in Japan

References

External links

 Tagiri Station information 

Railway stations in Nagano Prefecture
Railway stations in Japan opened in 1918
Stations of Central Japan Railway Company
Iida Line
Iijima, Nagano